Mariam Coulibaly (born 7 October 1997) is a Malian basketball player for Landerneau Bretagne Basket and the Malian national team.

She participated at the 2017 Women's Afrobasket.

References

External links

1997 births
Living people
Malian women's basketball players
Sportspeople from Bamako
Centers (basketball)
Malian expatriate basketball people in France
Malian expatriate basketball people in Spain
21st-century Malian people